Soldo is a surname found in Italy, Croatia and Serbia.

It is among the most common surnames in the Požega-Slavonia County of Croatia.

It may refer to the following people:

Carlo Soldo (born 1942), Italian football manager and former player
Eleonora Soldo (born 1984), Italian racing cyclist 
Ivan Soldo (born 1996), Australian rules footballer of Croatian descent
Marko Soldo (born 1996), Austrian football player
Nikola Soldo (born 2001), Croatian football defender 
Vinko Soldo (born 1998), Croatian football player 
Žarko Soldo (1953–2011), Serbian football manager and player
Zvonimir Soldo (born 1967), Croatian football player and manager

References

Italian-language surnames
Croatian surnames